Henosis is the classical Greek word for mystical "oneness", "union" or "unity". In Neoplatonism, henosis is unification with what is fundamental in reality: the One (Τὸ  Ἕν), the Source, or Monad. The Neoplatonic concept has precedents in the Greek mystery religions as well as parallels in Eastern philosophy. It is further developed in the Corpus Hermeticum, in Christian theology, Islamic Mysticism, soteriology and mysticism, and is an important factor in the historical development of monotheism during Late Antiquity.

Etymology
The term is relatively common in classical texts, and has the meaning of "union" or "unity".

Process of unification

Henosis, or primordial unity, is rational and deterministic, emanating from indeterminism an uncaused cause. Each individual as a microcosm reflects the gradual ordering of the universe referred to as the macrocosm. In mimicking the demiurge (divine mind), one unites with The One or Monad. Thus the process of unification, of "The Being" and "The One", is called henosis, the culmination of which is deification.

Plotinus

Henosis for Plotinus (204/5–270 CE) was defined in his works as a reversing of the ontological process of consciousness via meditation (or contemplation) toward no thought (nous or demiurge) and no division (dyad) within the individual (being). As is specified in the writings of Plotinus on Henology, one can reach a tabula rasa, a blank state where the individual may grasp or merge with The One. This absolute simplicity means that the nous or the person is then dissolved, completely absorbed back into the Monad. 

Within the Enneads of Plotinus, the Monad can be referred to as the Good above the demiurge. The Monad or dynamis (force) is of one singular expression (the will or the one is the good), all is contained in the Monad and the Monad is all and in all (panentheism). All division is reconciled in the one, the final stage before reaching singularity, and what is called duality (dyad) is completely reconciled in the Monad, Source or One (see monism). As the source or substance of all things, the Monad is all encompassing. As infinite and indeterminate, all is reconciled in the dynamis or one. It is the demiurge or second emanation that is the nous in Plotinus. It is the demiurge (creator, action, energy) or nous that "perceives," and therefore causes the force (potential or One) to manifest as energy, or the dyad called the material world. Nous as being, being and perception (intellect) manifest what is called soul (World Soul).

Plotinus words his teachings to reconcile not only Plato with Aristotle, but also various world religions that he had personal contact with during his various travels. Plotinus' works have an ascetic character in that they reject matter as an illusion (non-existent). Matter was strictly treated as immanent, with matter as essential to its being, having no true or transcendental character or essence, substance or ousia. This approach is called philosophical Idealism.

Phases
Plotinus' phases of "mystical union with the One" as given by Mazur (2021):

Phase 1, Catharsis: self-purification (aphairesis) from any contamination with multiplicity (of any thought, knowledge, or mental activity); "removing" Being itself (Enneads III.8.10)
Phase 2, Mystical self-reversion: "The intellect ... must ‘withdraw backwards’ and surrender itself to what lies behind it" (Enneads III.8.9)
Phase 3, Autophany: luminous vision of one's own self
Phase 3.2, Self-unification: to "become one from many" (Enneads VI.9.3)
Phase 4, Annihilation: discussed in the Enneads VI.9
Phase 5, Union with the One
Phase 5.2, Desubjectification

Passages in the Enneads describing the different stages of mystical union with the One can be found in I.6, IV.8, VI.9, III.8, V.3, V.5, V.8, and VI.7-8.

Iamblichus of Chalcis

Within the works of Iamblichus of Chalcis (c. 245 – c. 325 AD), The One and reconciliation of division can be obtained through the process of theurgy.  By mimicking the demiurge, the individual is returned to the cosmos to implement the will of the divine mind. One goes through a series of theurgy or rituals that unites the initiate to the Monad. These rituals mimic the ordering of the chaos of the Universe into the material world or cosmos. They also mimic the actions of the demiurge as the creator of the material world. Iamblichus used the rituals of the mystery religions to perform rituals on the individual to unite their outer and inner person. Thus one without conflict (whether internal or external) is united (henosis) and is The One (hen).

See also
Absolute (philosophy)
Apotheosis
Fana (Sufism)
Form of the Good
Hesychasm
Henology
Henotheism
Moksha
Monolatrism
Neoplatonism and Gnosticism
Nondualism
Rational mysticism
Self-realization
Theosis (Eastern Orthodox theology)

Notes

References

Sources

External links
 

Concepts in ancient Greek ethics
Hermeticism
Magic (supernatural)
Meditation
Mystical union
Mysticism
Neoplatonism
Theories in ancient Greek philosophy